Two Can Play That Game is a remix album by American singer Bobby Brown, released in 1995 on MCA Records.

Content
The album contains remixes of tracks from two of Brown's studio albums—Don't Be Cruel (1988) and Bobby (1992)—plus two tracks which appear in their original versions ("Don't Be Cruel" and "On Our Own"). The K-Klass remix of "Two Can Play That Game", which was released as a single, became a big hit throughout Europe in 1995, including reaching number 3 in the UK Singles Chart, becoming Brown's biggest hit single in that country. Three other singles were released from the album, all of them reaching the UK top 30: "Humpin' Around", also remixed by K-Klass (No. 8), "My Prerogative", remixed by Joe T. Vannelli (No. 17), and "Every Little Step", remixed by C.J. Mackintosh (No. 25).

Track listing

Charts

References

External links
Two Can Play That Game at Discogs

1995 remix albums
Bobby Brown albums
MCA Records remix albums
Albums produced by Babyface (musician)
Albums produced by L.A. Reid
Albums produced by Tricky Stewart